Yosef Sorinov (17 May 1946 – 1 February 2019) was an Israeli footballer.

Honours
Championships'''
1970–71

References

1946 births
2019 deaths
Israeli footballers
Israel international footballers
Beitar Tel Aviv F.C. players
Maccabi Tel Aviv F.C. players
Hapoel Ramat Gan F.C. players
Maccabi Netanya F.C. players
Beitar Jerusalem F.C. players
People from Legnica
Footballers at the 1976 Summer Olympics
Olympic footballers of Israel
Association football goalkeepers